Maximiliano Iván Cerato (born 21 April 1988 in Río Gallegos, Argentina) is an Argentine-Chilean footballer currently playing for Cobreloa in the Primera B de Chile.

Personal life
Cerato holds dual Argentine-Chilean nationality since he naturalized Chilean by residence in January 2019.

References

External links
 
 

1988 births
Living people
People from Río Gallegos, Santa Cruz
Argentine footballers
Argentine expatriate footballers
Argentine emigrants to Chile
Naturalized citizens of Chile
Chilean footballers
Chilean Primera División players
Primera B de Chile players
Everton de Viña del Mar footballers
Cobreloa footballers
Liga MX players
Club León footballers
Argentine expatriate sportspeople in Chile
Argentine expatriate sportspeople in Mexico
Expatriate footballers in Chile
Expatriate footballers in Mexico
Association football forwards